Simhadri is a 2014 Indian Kannada-language action drama film directed and written by Shivamani, making his comeback after 4 years since his last film Jhossh released. The film stars Duniya Vijay and Soundarya Jayamala and is produced by R. S. Gowda under the banner Mega Hit films.

The film released on 2 October 2014 to the average response from the critics. Set in a rural background, the film moves around the brother - sister sentiments played by Vijay and Aishwarya respectively and the story unfolds the emotional journey of the siblings amidst troubles brought upon them.

Cast
 Duniya Vijay as Simhadri
 Soundarya Jayamala
 Aishwarya
 Jai Jagadish
 Ramesh Bhat
 Padma Vasanthi
 Suchendra Prasad
 Kote Prabhakar

Soundtrack
The music for the film is composed by Arjun Janya. The soundtrack consists of 4 songs of which two are written by K. Kalyan and one each written by Yogaraj Bhat and V. Nagendra Prasad.

Track list

References

External links
Duniya Vijay's Simhadri To Start Shooting On Rajinikanth's Birthday
Simhadri shoot almost complete

2014 films
2010s Kannada-language films
2014 action drama films
Films scored by Arjun Janya
Indian action drama films